A18 Road is a national road running from Gweru to Zvishavane/A9 Highway junction in central Zimbabwe. It begins in Gweru at the roundabout where 7th Street ends.   and ends at the intersection with A9/P7 Highway just after Zvishavane town.

Operations

The road runs through the chrome mining town of Shurugwi to the asbestos famous Zvishavane mines.

Junctions

From Gweru after Boterekwa Pass in Shurugwi Chachacha Road branches to the left.   This road runs past Chachacha Growth Point to Chivi.   From Chivi the road continues to a point known as the "Chivi Turn-off" along the A4 Highway/R1 Highway that runs from Harare to Beitbridge via Masvingo.    This is at Toll Plaza number  22 on the A4 Highway 45 km south-west of Masvingo ), to also catch up with vehicles from this road.

Major Bridges
 Runde River

See also
 Highway/P7 Highway
 A5 Highway
 ZINARA
 Zvishavane

References

Roads in Zimbabwe